Zauresh Baibussinova (Zaureş Baibusinova; born July 13, 1970 in Almaty) is a Kazakhstani sport shooter. At age thirty-eight, Baibussinova made her official debut for the 2008 Summer Olympics in Beijing, where she competed in two pistol shooting events. She placed thirteenth out of forty-four shooters in the women's 10 m air pistol, with a total score of 382 points. Three days later, Baibussinova competed for her second event, 25 m pistol, where she was able to shoot 281 targets in the precision stage, and 290 in the rapid fire, for a total score of 571 points, finishing only in thirty-first place.

References

External links
NBC 2008 Olympics profile

Kazakhstani female sport shooters
Living people
Olympic shooters of Kazakhstan
Shooters at the 2008 Summer Olympics
Sportspeople from Almaty
1970 births
Asian Games medalists in shooting
Shooters at the 1994 Asian Games
Shooters at the 2002 Asian Games
Shooters at the 2006 Asian Games
Shooters at the 2010 Asian Games
Shooters at the 2014 Asian Games
Asian Games gold medalists for Kazakhstan
Asian Games silver medalists for Kazakhstan
Asian Games bronze medalists for Kazakhstan
Medalists at the 1994 Asian Games
Medalists at the 2002 Asian Games
Medalists at the 2010 Asian Games
Shooters at the 2018 Asian Games